Zama Ashley Rambuwane (born 24 January 1997) is a South African footballer who played as a midfielder .

Club career

SuperSport United
In February 2014, Rambuwane was promoted to SuperSport United's senior team.

In June 2015, he trialled with Club Brugge. In August 2016, he trialled in Portugal and Israel.

Loan to Hapoel Ra'anana
On 25 August 2016, Rambuwane joined Hapoel Ra'anana on a one-year loan deal with a permanent transfer option at the end of the season.

Loan to Ironi Nesher
After featuring 7 times for Hapoel Ra'anana in Israel's top-flight, on 25 January 2017 Rambuwane joined Ironi Nesher from Israel's second division on a loan until the end of the season to get game time and become fully acclimatised to Israel.

Loan to Platinum Stars
In January 2018, Rambuwane joined Platinum Stars on a six-month loan until the end of the season. He scored against Ajax Cape Town in his debut match for the club.

Loan to Cape Umoya United
In July 2018, Rambuwane was loaned to Cape Umoya United.

References

1997 births
Living people
South African soccer players
Association football midfielders
SuperSport United F.C. players
Hapoel Ra'anana A.F.C. players
Ironi Nesher F.C. players
Platinum Stars F.C. players
South African expatriate soccer players
Expatriate footballers in Israel
South African expatriate sportspeople in Israel
South African Premier Division players
Israeli Premier League players
Liga Leumit players
National First Division players